Sini is a Finnish female given name. Its nameday is celebrated on 2 September. In Finland, it began to be used in the 1930s, and it reached its peak of popularity in the 1980s and 1990s. As of 2012 there are over 9000 women with this name in Finland.

Origin and variants

The name Sini means blue. It originated as a variant of the name Sinikka, which in turn comes from Sininen, the Finnish word for blue.

Notable people
Notable people with this name include:
 Sini Anderson, American film director, producer, performance artist and poet
 Sini Häkkinen, Finnish volleyball player
 Sini Latvala, Finnish hammer thrower

References

Finnish feminine given names